Poecilanthrax varius is a species of bee flies (insects in the family Bombyliidae).

References

Bombyliidae
Articles created by Qbugbot
Insects described in 1960